Richard Löwenbein (1894–1943) was an Austrian screenwriter and film director. He was active in the German film industry during the Weimar Republic. The Jewish Löwenbein left Germany for France following the Nazi Party's rise to power in 1933. After Germany occupied France in 1940 he was arrested and held at the Drancy internment camp before being transported to Auschwitz where he was killed.

Selected filmography
 The Amazon (1921)
 Rose of the Asphalt Streets (1922)
 The Fire Ship (1922)
 The Golden Net (1922)
 Two Worlds (1922)
 The Diadem of the Czarina (1922)
 The Young Man from the Ragtrade (1926)
 The Crazy Countess (1928)
 Misled Youth (1929)

References

Bibliography

External links

1894 births
1943 deaths
Film people from Vienna
Austrian Jews who died in the Holocaust
Austrian film directors
Austrian emigrants to Germany
Austrian emigrants to France
Jewish emigrants from Austria after the Anschluss
20th-century Austrian screenwriters
20th-century Austrian male writers